Craig Unger (b. March 25, 1949) is an American journalist and writer. He has served as deputy editor of The New York Observer and was editor-in-chief of Boston Magazine. He has written about George H. W. Bush and George W. Bush for The New Yorker, Esquire Magazine, and Vanity Fair.  He has written about the Romney family and Hart InterCivic.

Early life and education
Unger grew up in Dallas, Texas, and attended Harvard University.

Career
On April 11, 2004, Unger wrote an op-ed for The Boston Globe demanding answers from the 9/11 Commission on who had given permission for Saudi nationals to leave the United States. He repeated the theme in his 2004 book, House of Bush, House of Saud, that was also featured in Michael Moore's film Fahrenheit 9/11:
"Is it possible that President Bush himself played a role in authorizing the evacuation of the Saudis after 9/11?" Unger reportedly traced $1.4 billion in investments by the Saudis to friends and business organizations closely associated with the Bush family.

Unger's 2007 book The Fall of the House of Bush is about the internal feud in the Bush family and the rise and collusion of the neoconservative and Christian right in Republican party politics, viewing each group's world view and efforts concerning present and potential future US policy through a distinctly negative prism. In his previous work, House of Bush, House of Saud explored the relationship between the Bush family and the House of Saud.

In his 2018 book, House of Trump, House of Putin: The Untold Story of Donald Trump and the Russian Mafia, Unger tells about links existing between the Russian mafia, Vladimir Putin and the Trump Organization. He names 59 Russians as long-term business associates of Donald Trump

Books
 Blue Blood (1989). New York: St. Martin's Press. . .
 House of Bush, House of Saud: The Secret Relationship Between the World's Two Most Powerful Dynasties (2004). New York: Scribner. . .
 The Fall of the House of Bush: The Untold Story of How a Band of True Believers Seized the Executive Branch, Started the Iraq War, and Still Imperils America's Future (2007). New York: Scribner. . . 
 American Armageddon: How the Delusions of the Neoconservatives and the Christian Right Triggered the Descent of America--and Still Imperil Our Future.  (2008) New York: Scribner. . .
 Boss Rove: Inside Karl Rove's Secret Kingdom of Power (2012). New York: Scribner. . .
 When Women Win: EMILY's List and the Rise of Women in American Politics (2016), with Ellen Malcolm. Boston: Houghton Mifflin Harcourt. . .
 House of Trump, House of Putin: The Untold Story of Donald Trump and the Russian Mafia (2018). New York, New York: Dutton. . .
 American Kompromat: How the KGB Cultivated Donald Trump, and Related Tales of Sex, Greed, Power, and Treachery (2021). New York, New York: Dutton. . .

See also
 Business projects of Donald Trump in Russia

Notes and references

External links

 Craig Unger Bio
 
 
 
 'War president' Bush has always been soft on terror, Craig Unger, The Guardian, September 11, 2004
 Saving the Saudis Craig Unger, Vanity Fair at Wes Jones.

American male journalists
American magazine editors
American political writers
American foreign policy writers
American male non-fiction writers
Living people
Harvard University alumni
1949 births